Irkutsk State Linguistic University was a university in Irkutsk, Siberia in eastern Russia founded in 1948.

In 2016, it was integrated into Irkutsk State University as the newly created Institute of Philology, Foreign Languages and Media Communication 
.

The university consists of two institutes (Institute of Cross-cultural Communication and Institute of Educational Technologies) and two independent faculties (Social Sciences Faculty and Education-by-Correspondence Faculty).

Academics
The university gives linguistic education from secondary school to university to post-graduate and post-doctoral research programmes.

License
A national license empowers the university to train professionals in 17 major areas at 10 faculties.

Institutes
Institute of Cross-cultural Communication

Oriental Languages Faculty teaches:
 'Linguistics and Cross-cultural Communication. The qualification granted is 'Linguist-translator of two foreign languages' (Chinese and English, Japanese and English, Korean and English).
 Foreign and home policy of China. The qualification granted is 'Regional studies specialist'.

Translation and Translatology Faculty
 Linguistics and Cross-cultural Communication. The qualification granted is 'Linguist-translator of two foreign languages' (European languages, such as English, French, German, Spanish, Italian).
 Foreign and home policy of the USA and Canada' The qualification granted is 'Regional studies specialist'.

International Faculty
 Linguistics. The Russian language.
Degrees: 
 Bachelor (8-semester training)
 Master (4-semester training).
The faculty offers post-graduate research programmes in Germanic and Romance philology (6 semesters of professional seminars including writing and public defense of candidate dissertation).

Institute of Educational Technologies

English Language Faculty
 Linguistics and Cross-cultural Communication. The qualification granted is 'Linguist-teacher of two foreign languages'
 Linguistics and Cross-cultural Communication. The qualification granted is 'Linguist-translator of two foreign languages'
 Personal and Public Security Service plus Modern English. The qualification granted is 'Teacher of Personal and Public Security Service. Teacher of English
 Linguistics and New Information Technologies. The qualification granted is 'Linguist'.
 Philological Education. The qualification granted is 'Bachelor of Philological Education; Modern English and Russian as a Foreign Language'.

Romance Languages Faculty
 Linguistics and Cross-cultural Communication. The qualification granted is 'Linguist-teacher of two foreign languages'(Spanish-English, French-English, Italian-English)
 Linguistics and Cross-cultural Communication. The qualification granted is 'Linguist-translator of two foreign languages' (Spanish-English, French-English, Italian-English)
 Personal and Public Security Service plus Modern English. The qualification granted is 'Teacher of Personal and Public Security Service. Teacher of Spanish, or Teacher of French or Teacher of Italian'
 Linguistics and New Information Technologies. The qualification granted is 'Linguist'.
 Philological Education. The qualification granted is 'Bachelor of Philological Education; Modern French (or Spanish or Italian) and Russian as a Foreign Language'.

German Language Faculty
 Linguistics and Cross-cultural Communication. The qualification granted is 'Linguist-teacher of two foreign languages' (German and English)

Humanities Faculty
 Documentology and Documentary Logistics. The qualification granted is 'Documentation manager with professional knowledge of two foreign languages (French and English)'.

Social Sciences Faculty
 Management of Organization. The qualification granted is 'Manager'.
 Public Relations. The qualification granted is 'Public Relations Manager with professional knowledge of foreign languages'
 Pedagogy and Infant School Education Methodology. The qualification granted is 'Teacher of infant school. Teacher of English' 
 Philology. The qualification granted is 'Teacher of two foreign languages'.
 Advertisement. The qualification granted is 'Advertisement manager'.

Education-by-Correspondence Faculty
 Linguistics and Cross-cultural Communication. The qualification granted is 'Linguist-teacher of English/German/French'
'* Linguistics and Cross-cultural Communication. The qualification granted is 'Linguist-translator of English/German'

Second higher education

ISLU offers the following higher education opportunities to holders of non-linguistic university qualifications:
 Linguistics and Cross-cultural Communication. The qualification granted is 'Linguist-teacher of English/German/French'
 Linguistics and Cross-cultural Communication. The qualification granted is 'Linguist- translator of English/German/French'
 Management of Organization. The qualification granted is 'Manager'
 Public Relations. The qualification granted is 'Public Relations Manager with professional knowledge of foreign languages'
 Advertisement'. The qualification granted is 'Advertisement Manager'.

Students and teachers as well as 'outsiders' who are interested in language learning and related areas are offered educational services including: 
 3rd or 4th foreign language learning,
 Graduation qualifications in Public Relations/Management of Organization/Advertisement,
 Graded or community-related teaching of foreign languages: 
 to beginners; 
 conversational versions; 
 to advanced learners; 
 to particular age groups of children.

"Young Polyglot" language learners community; 
 Preparatory and placement courses for international exams (FCE, TOEFL, IELTS, DAF, JLPT, TOPIK); 
 Business German/Business French; 
 English for tourism/German for tourism/Japanese Guide Courses.

Annually, more than 700 students use the opportunities of additional educational services at ISLU.

Irkutsk State Linguistic University is a site for international language proficiency exams such as Japanese Language Proficiency Test (日本語能力試験), Test of Proficiency in Korean (한국어능력시험).

References

External links
Irkutsk State Linguistic University Official website 
Irkutsk State Linguistic University Official website 

Universities and institutes established in the Soviet Union
Universities in Irkutsk Oblast
Buildings and structures in Irkutsk
Academic language institutions